Vack is a surname. Notable people with the surname include:

Bert le Vack  (1887–1931), English motorcycle racer
Peter Vack (born 1986), American actor, writer, director, and producer

See also
Hack (name)
Lack (surname)
Vock